This is a list of bird species by global population, divided by bird classification. While numbers are estimates, they have been made by the experts in their fields. For more information on how these estimates were ascertained, see Wikipedia's articles on population biology and population ecology. Contributing organizations include the IUCN, BirdLife International, and Partners in Flight.

The average global population of all mature birds is estimated to be somewhat less than 90 billion (actually, somewhere between 40 and 130 billion; this too is a rough estimate). The total population including younglings is somewhat higher during the breeding season of each species.

This list is incomplete, because experts have not estimated all bird numbers. For example, the spectacled flowerpecker was only discovered in 2010, and did not receive its scientific name (Dicaeum dayakorum) until 2019, adding to the other 73 new bird species described by ornithologists from 2000 – 2009. Global population estimates for many of these at this time would lack accuracy.

All numbers are estimates, because they are taken by observation, and a given number of 50 slender-billed curlews does not necessarily mean there are 10 more of this species than the black stilt, which has been estimated at 40: there is a possibility that the latter species has a larger population than the former. This list should not be taken that literally. An estimate of 250 shore dotterels compared with 4,500 – 5,000 wrybills, on the other hand, means that the latter has well over one order of magnitude more individuals than the former. The wrybill only has approximately one tenth the population of great skuas (48,000), which are outnumbered ~10:1 by the pigeon guillemot (470,000). It is these large differences between species that this list tries to convey.

By taxonomy

See also

Lists of mammals by population
Lists of organisms by population

Notes
1.Amount of quantified species contained in the list as of the "Retrieved" date in the corresponding citation. The amount of species in each order is according to the IUCN and BirdLife International; bird taxonomy is currently in flux and these figures may soon change.
2.Preliminary estimate.
3.Mature only.

References

Birds